Shojaabad-e Pain (also Romanized as Shojā‘ābād-e Pā’īn; also known as Shojā‘ābād and Shujā‘ābād) is a village in Rezvan Rural District, Ferdows District, Rafsanjan County, Kerman Province, Iran. At the 2006 census, its population was 158, in 43 families.

References 

Populated places in Rafsanjan County